The Eastern View High School (EVHS) is a public high school located in rural Culpeper County, Virginia, in the United States. The school shares its district with Culpeper County High School (CCHS). The school was built in 2008, and now holds around 1,200 students.

History
The construction for Eastern View High School began in 2006 and was completed in 2008. Eastern View High School is designed to be a green school. The plant recycles non-consumable water. The facility also utilizes natural light by providing a network of windows in both outside and inside walls. The school recycles paper, plastic, aluminum, and cardboard. On the school grounds are a rain garden and a small area of wetlands. The principal of Eastern View High School is Nathan Bop.

Academic opportunities 
In addition to courses on the EVHS campus, students can apply to participate in specialized programs that meet at off-campus locations. A cohort of EVHS students attend Mountain Vista Governor's School to take advanced math, science, humanities, and research courses once they enter their sophomore, junior, and senior years. Additionally, through a partnership with Germanna Community College students are offered the opportunity to enroll in Germanna Scholars, the successful completion of the Germanna Scholars program allows students to earn an associate degree prior to high school graduation.

References

External links 
Eastern View High School Home Page

Schools in Culpeper County, Virginia
Educational institutions established in 2008
Public high schools in Virginia
2008 establishments in Virginia